The Constitution of Ukrainian People's Republic is a constitutional document approved by the Central Council of Ukraine on April 29, 1918, but never promulgated. Hence the document never acquired the legal power. Nevertheless, it remains an important document from the period of the Ukrainian People's Republic from 1917-1918.

The Constitution's main principle was separation of powers. This is not surprising given that it was modeled after democratic constitutions of Europe and the United States.

The constitution was composed of 83 articles, which were divided into 8 sections:

Section I. General Principles 

The section consists of six bullets and simply declares that every citizen on UPR is equal in his or her rights and that the government of UPR is the only government of the republic. The regional administration is given a right of self-government, while sustaining the principle of decentralization.

Section II. Rights of the Citizens of Ukraine 

The section contains 15 bullets. Here are some of the examples. 
 8. The citizen of UPR cannot be simultaneously the citizen of another state.
 11. The lawful, civil, and political powers of the citizen of UPR starts from 20 years of age. Any difference in rights and duties between men and women the Law of UPR does not know.
 13. No citizen of UPR nor anybody else can be arrested on the territory without the court order unless during the hot act. Although even in such a case he must be released no later than 24 hours if the court will not identify any case of the arrest.
 15. House property is recognized as the untouchable. Any kind of search cannot take place without the court order. If in special cases the law enforcement agencies violate the right, the court order at the request of a citizen will be presented during the next 48 hours upon the completion of the search.

Section III. Authorities of the Ukrainian People's Republic 

Five-bullet section.
 23. The supreme government of UPR are the All-Peoples Congress that without intermediateries act as the supreme legislative power in UPR and form the powers of the Executive and the Judicial government of UPR.
 24. The supreme Executive power in UPR belongs to the Council of the People's Ministers.
 25. The supreme Judicial power is the General Court of UPR.
 26. All kinds of local affairs are conducted by the elected Council and the community Administration of volosts and lands. All of the local governing belongs directly and with no intermediaries to them. The ministers only supervise and coordinate their actions (#50) with no intermediaries and through the appointed by them officials not intruding into the affairs of those Councils and Administrations and all the arguments in that regard are decided through the Court of the Ukrainian People's Republic (##60-68).

Section IV. All-Peoples Congress of the Ukrainian People's Republic

Section V. On the Council of the People's Ministers of the Ukrainian People's Republic

Section VI. Courts of the Ukrainian People's Republic

Section VII. National unions

Section VIII. On the temporary termination of citizen's rights

See also
 Constitution of Pylyp Orlyk (1710)
 Constitution of Ukraine (1996)

References

External links
 
 
 1918 Constitution of Ukraine
 1918 Constitution of Ukraine at the website of Verkhovna Rada

Political history of Ukraine
Constitutions of Ukraine
Legal history of Ukraine
Ukrainian People's Republic
1917 documents